Murchisonella is a genus of sea snails, marine gastropod mollusks in the subfamily Murchisonellinae of the family Murchisonellidae, the pyrams and their allies.

Species
Species within the genus Murchisonella include:
 Murchisonella africana Peñas & Rolán, 2013
 Murchisonella anabathron (Hedley, 1906)
 Murchisonella angolensis Peñas & Rolán, 2013
 Murchisonella aqabaensis (Bandel, 2005)
 Murchisonella arabica Bandel, 2005
 † Murchisonella bezanconi (Cossmann, 1892) 
 Murchisonella cebuana Bandel, 2005
 Murchisonella columna (Hedley, 1907)
 Murchisonella curvistriata Peñas & Rolán, 2013
 Murchisonella declivita (Laseron, 1951)
 Murchisonella densistriata (Nomura, 1936)
 Murchisonella dubia Peñas & Rolán, 2013
 Murchisonella evermanni (Baker, Hanna & Strong, 1928)
 Murchisonella galapagensis Peñas & Rolán, 2013
 Murchisonella hatienensis (Saurin, 1962)
 Murchisonella latisulcata Peñas & Rolán, 2013
 Murchisonella mediterranea Peñas & Rolán, 2013
 Murchisonella modesta Peñas & Rolán, 2013
 Murchisonella modestissima Peñas & Rolán, 2013
 Murchisonella occidentalis (Hemphill, 1894)
 Murchisonella saotomensis Peñas & Rolán, 2013
 Murchisonella spectrum (Mörch, 1875)
 Murchisonella subangulata (Laseron, 1959)
 Murchisonella ultima Rolán, Fernández-Garcés & Rubio, 2013
Species brought into synonymy
 Murchisonella gittenbergeri (De Jong & Coomans, 1988): synonym of Aclis gittenbergeri (De Jong & Coomans, 1988)

References

 Peñas, A.; Rolán, E. (2013). Revision of the genera Murchisonella and Pseudoaclisina (Gastropoda, Heterobranchia, Murchisonellidae). Vita Malacologica. 11: 15-64
 Gofas, S.; Le Renard, J.; Bouchet, P. (2001). Mollusca. in: Costello, M.J. et al. (Ed.) (2001). European register of marine species: a check-list of the marine species in Europe and a bibliography of guides to their identification. Collection Patrimoines Naturels. 50: pp. 180–213.

External links
 Bartsch, P. (1947). A monograph of the West Atlantic mollusks of the family Aclididae. Smithsonian Miscellaneous Collections. 106 (20): 1-29, 6 pls
 Laseron, C. F. (1951). The New South Wales Pyramidellidae and the genus Mathilda. Records of the Australian Museum. 22 (4): 298–334
 World Register of Marine Species

Murchisonellidae